Samuel Sheppard (–) was an English author and poet of the Civil War who sometimes published under the anagrammatic pseudonym Raphael Desmus.

Life 
Samuel Sheppard was the son of Harman Sheppard, physician, who died on 12 July 1639, aged ninety, by his wife Petronella née Parnell, who died on 10 September 1650. His parents married at Christ Church, London, on 10 April 1623, and Sheppard seems to have grown up in London and its environs. He was related to Sir Christopher Clapham of Beamsley in Yorkshire, to whom he dedicated several of his books. No record of his education survives, though he appears to have taken holy orders and become a Presbyterian minister: John Hackluyt, a rival writer, called Sheppard a "blasphemous Cleargy-spot".  

Sheppard commenced his literary career about 1606 as amanuensis to Ben Jonson, but wrote nothing himself till a later period. From 1646 to 1654 he wrote copiously, in news weeklies, prose reports, essays, poetry, and drama, about the events of the Civil War. Like his connections the Claphams, Sheppard was an ardent Royalist. He twice suffered imprisonment for his opinions, once in 1650 in Whittington College, and again for fourteen months in Newgate. His wife's name was Mary.

Works 

He was the author of: 

 The Farmers Farmed, London, 1646, 4to.
 The False Alarm, London, 1646, 4to. 3.
 The Year of Jubilee, London, 1646, 4to.
 The Times displayed in Six Sestyads, London, 1646, 4to.
 The Committee Man Curried, London, 1647, 4to (two short farces almost entirely made up of plagiarisms from Sir John Suckling).
 Grand Pluto's Progress through Great Britain, 1647.
 The Loves of Amandus and Sophronia, London, 1650, 8vo.
 Epigrams, London, 1651, 8vo.
 The Joviall Crew, London, 1651, 4to.
 Discoveries, or an Explication of some Enigmatic Verities. Also a Seraphick Rhapsodie on the Passion of Jesus Christ, London, 1652.
 Parliament Routed, London, 1653.

Hazlitt also ascribes to him the preface to Captain Hobson's Fallacy of Infant Baptism Discovered, London, 1645, 4to, together with God and Mammon, 1646, 4to, The Weepers, London, 1652, 4to, and a ballad, St. George for England, London, 1650. All these pieces and items 3, 4, 7, 8, and 9 above are in the British Library. Some lines by Sheppard preface Thomas Manly's Veni, Vidi, Vici, London, 1652, 8vo, and he left in manuscript (now in the Bodleian Library) The Faerie King, a continuation of Spenser's Faerie Queene.

References

Notes

Citations

Bibliography 

  
 King, Andrew (2004). "Sheppard, Samuel (c. 1624–1655?)". In Oxford Dictionary of National Biography. Oxford: Oxford University Press.

1624 births
1655 deaths
17th-century English male writers
17th-century English poets